Schlachter or Schlächter is an occupational surname literally meaning butcher, slaughterer in German. Notable people with the surname include:

Chris Schlachter
Dirk Schlächter
Franz Eugen Schlachter
Jalen Schlachter
Philipp Schlachter
Ricardo Schlachter
Steve Schlachter

See also

Occupational surnames
German-language surnames